Leonardo da Vinci (1452–1519) was an Italian Renaissance polymath.

Da Vinci or variant, may also refer to:

People

People with the surname
 Da Vinci family, an Italian family
 Pierino da Vinci (c. 1529-1553/54), sculptor, Leonardo's nephew
 Paul Da Vinci (born Paul Prewer) (b. 1951), English pop singer

Fictional characters
 Dominic Da Vinci, titular character from Da Vinci's Inquest

Nicknames
 Dmytro Kotsiubailo (1995–2023; nom-de-guerre; Da Vinci), Ukrainian soldier

Places
 Da Vinci (lunar crater)
 Da Vinci (Martian crater)

Technology
 Da Vinci Surgical System, a robotic surgery system
 da Vinci Systems, a color correction company (liquidated in 2009 and assets acquired by Blackmagic Design)
DaVinci Resolve, video editing software originally authored by da Vinci Systems and developed by Blackmagic Design
 da Vinci Project, a planned suborbital crewed spacecraft
 Texas Instruments DaVinci, a system-on-a-chip for digital video
 Da Vinci Machine, a project to add dynamic language support to the Java Virtual Machine
 DaVinci (software), a development tool used to create HTML5 mobile applications and media content
 DAVINCI, a planned NASA mission that will send an atmospheric probe to Venus

Music
 Da Vinci (band), a Portuguese pop rock band
 "Da Vinci" (song), a song by Weezer

Other uses 
 Da Vinci (restaurant), a restaurant in Maasbracht, Netherlands
 GTS Da Vinci, a cruise ship owned by Club Cruise
 DaVinci Academy of Science and the Arts, a charter school in Ogden, Utah
 Da Vinci Tower, a proposed building in Dubai, United Arab Emirates
 Da Vinci (magazine), magazine about books published in Japan

See also

 List of things named after Leonardo da Vinci
 Cycles Devinci, makers of Devinci bicycles
 The Da Vinci Code (disambiguation), the novel by Dan Brown and related items
 Leonardo da Vinci (disambiguation)
 Vinci (disambiguation)